Yunnan Lvshan Landscape is a Chinese UCI Continental cycling team established in 2014.

Team roster

References

External links

UCI Continental Teams (Asia)
Cycling teams established in 2014
Cycling teams based in China
2014 establishments in China